Botanical Studies is a peer-reviewed open access scientific journal covering all aspects of botany. It is published by Springer Science+Business Media and affiliated with the Institute of Plant and Microbial Biology (Academia Sinica, Taiwan). The editors-in-chief is Yu-Ming Ju (Academia Sinica). The journal was established in 1947 as the Botanical Bulletin of Academia Sinica, receiving its current title in 2006.

Abstracting and indexing
The journal is abstracted and indexed in:

According to the Journal Citation Reports, the journal has a 2020 impact factor of 2.787.

References

External links
 
 Institute of Plant and Microbial Biology, Academia Sinica, Taiwan

English-language journals
Publications established in 1947
Botany journals
Creative Commons Attribution-licensed journals
Springer Science+Business Media academic journals
Open access journals
Academic journals of Taiwan
Academia Sinica